Shelter of Jesus the Good Shepherd for the Poor and Migrant (Albergue Jesús el Buen Pastor del Pobre y el Migrante) is a refugee shelter in Tapachula, Chiapas, Mexico for Latin American migrants.

About 
The migrants are injured and disabled by freight trains, frequently suffering amputation, in their attempted migration out of Latin America to the United States. The trains take the Chiapas-Mayab line, running north-south through Mexico and are called "The Death Express" or La Bestia "The Beast" by migrants. Some of the injured migrants have suffered violence at the hands of gangs who attack those who do not pay to ride The Beast, and commit other acts of violence against migrants. The shelter has been funded by private donations, and by the United States Department of State Bureau of Population, Refugees
and Migration, and Australia's Department of Foreign Affairs and Trade.

It is one of several migrant shelters in Mexico including Acayucan Migrant Shelter, Ixtepecs Brothers Along the Way Migrant Shelter, Guadalupan Diocesan Shelter of Tierra Blanca, Reynosa's Our Lady of Guadalupe Shelter, Reynosas Christian Way of Life Shelter, Saltillo Migrant Center, and The 72 – Shelter for Migrants.

The shelter was founded in the late 1990s by Olga Sanchez Martinez, recipient of the National Human Rights Commission of Mexicos  in 2004. She remains its director as of 2015.

References

Sources

Further reading

External links 
Official website archived September 12, 2016 at Internet Archive

Buildings and structures in Chiapas
Charities based in Mexico
Charities for disabled people
Health charities
Refugee aid organizations